The 1872 Northern West Riding of Yorkshire by-election was fought on 3 February 1872[20 2].  The byelection was fought due to the Death of the incumbent MP of the Liberal Party, Sir Francis Crossley.  It was won by the Conservative candidate Francis Sharp Powell.

References

Northern West Riding of Yorkshire by-election
Northern West Riding of Yorkshire by-election
Northern West Riding of Yorkshire by-election
By-elections to the Parliament of the United Kingdom in Yorkshire and the Humber constituencies
19th century in Yorkshire